Ready for Whatever may refer to:
 Ready for Whatever (T.I. song)
 Ready for Whatever (Mýa song)